Sonny Meets Hawk! is a 1963 album by jazz saxophonist Sonny Rollins, with Coleman Hawkins appearing as guest artist. It was recorded at RCA Victor Studio "B" in New York City on July 15 and 18, 1963.  The album features some of Rollins's most avant-garde playing.

The album marks the first time the two saxophonists had entered a recording studio together, although they had appeared on stage together briefly that same year at the Newport Jazz Festival.

Track listing
"Yesterdays" (Jerome Kern, Otto Harbach) – 5:13
"All the Things You Are" (Kern, Oscar Hammerstein II) – 9:33
"Summertime" (DuBose Heyward, George Gershwin, Ira Gershwin) – 5:58
"Just Friends" (John Klenner, Sam M. Lewis) – 4:40
"Lover Man (Oh Where Can You Be?)" – (Jimmy Davis, Roger "Ram" Ramirez, James Sherman) – 8:54
"At McKies'" (Rollins) – 7:03

Personnel
Sonny Rollins – tenor saxophone
Coleman Hawkins – tenor saxophone
Paul Bley – piano 
Roy McCurdy – drums 
Bob Cranshaw – bass (tracks 1, 2, and 5) – recorded July 15
Henry Grimes – bass (tracks 3, 4, and 6) – recorded July 18

References

Sonny Rollins albums
RCA Victor albums
1963 albums
Albums produced by George Avakian